Miss Ko is a Taiwanese-American singer-songwriter and rapper signed to Universal Music Group. Ko has released three studio albums and is the winner of Best New Artist of 24th Golden Melody Award in Taiwan, the first rapper/hip-hop artist to win the award.

Life and career
Christine Ko was raised in Queens, New York. She graduated from Brooklyn Technical High School and attended Five Towns College.

Ko released her first album in 2009, while based in New York. She studied Mandarin at National Taiwan Normal University, and during that time participated in a rap competition, which brought her to the attention of an executive at the music label KAO!INC. She left a master's program at New York University to pursue her music career in Taiwan. In 2010, Miss Ko was regarded as a "newcomer to the scene," and Meredith Schweig observed that there were no other professional women rappers in Taiwan at the time.

2012–2015: Knock Out and XXXIII
Ko released her debut album Knock Out on August 15, 2012. Knock Out peaked No. 1 on local music charts and won Ko Best New Artist at the 24th Annual Golden Melody Awards, in addition to "Most Outstanding Asian-American Youth Overseas" that same year.

On December 31, 2014, Ko released her second album XXXIII (33), which featured various artists such as Crowd Lu, Billie, and Amber An.

2016–present: Queen of Queens

In 2016, Ko signed with Universal Music Group. On December 22, 2016, Ko released her third album Queen of Queens. The album reached No. 1 on i-Tunes and Spotify.

Ko was nominated for Best Female Artist at the 28th Annual Golden Melody Awards.

On March 27, 2018, Ko was announced as the spokesperson for McDonald's.

Discography

Albums
 Knock Out (August 15, 2012)
 XXXIII (December 31, 2014)
 Queen of Queens (December 22, 2016)

Collaborations
 "Walk This Way" by adidas unite all originals also feat.
 "Melting Gold" by Soft Lipa also feat. Show Lo (2013)
 "疯起来/Feng Qi Lai" by Sun Sheng Xi (2014) 
 "愛不來/No Love" by Khalil Fong (2014) 
 "跳進來/Jump In" by A-mei 張惠妹 (2014)

Other ventures

On August 14, 2015, Ko performed and threw the ceremonial first pitch for her hometown team, the Mets, at Citi Field.

References

External links

1985 births
Living people
21st-century American singers
Feminist musicians
Brooklyn Technical High School alumni
Sex-positive feminists
New York University alumni
American musicians of Taiwanese descent
American women musicians of Chinese descent
American feminists
Musicians from Queens, New York
American emigrants to Taiwan
Taiwanese feminists
American women rappers
21st-century women rappers
Taiwanese rappers
21st-century American women singers
Rappers from New York City
American women singer-songwriters
Taiwanese singer-songwriters
Universal Music Group artists
National Taiwan Normal University alumni
Singer-songwriters from New York (state)